Xaa-Pro aminopeptidase 2 is an enzyme that in humans is encoded by the XPNPEP2 gene.

Aminopeptidase P is a hydrolase specific for N-terminal imido bonds, which are common to several collagen degradation products, neuropeptides, vasoactive peptides, and cytokines. Structurally, the enzyme is a member of the 'pita bread fold' family and occurs in mammalian tissues in both soluble and GPI-anchored membrane-bound forms. A membrane-bound and soluble form of this enzyme have been identified as products of two separate genes.

References

Further reading